St Mary's Church, Temple Balsall is a parish church in the Church of England in Temple Balsall, Solihull, West Midlands, England.

History
The church is of 13th century style but was heavily restored by Sir George Gilbert Scott in 1849. The church is a Grade I listed building.

It is thought that the church was built by the Knights Templar and is the Mother Church of the Templars and the Knight Hospitallers. Knights of both Orders are illustrated in the Altar window.

Organ
The church has a small pipe organ by Porritt of Leicester, which was restored and revoiced by the late Peter Collins 2012–2014. A specification of the organ can be found on the National Pipe Organ Register.

See also

Balsall Preceptory

References

Grade I listed churches in the West Midlands (county)
Preceptories of the Knights Hospitaller in England
Church of England church buildings in the West Midlands (county)
Anglo-Catholic church buildings in the West Midlands (county)